Old media, or legacy media, are the mass media institutions that dominated prior to the Information Age; particularly print media, film studios, music studios, advertising agencies, radio broadcasting, and television.

Old media institutions are centralized and communicate with one-way technologies to a generally anonymous mass audience. By definition, it is often dichotomized with New media, more often computer technologies that are interactive and comparatively decentralized; they enable people to telecommunicate with one another, due to their mass use and availability, namely through internet.

Old Media companies have diminished in the last decade with the changing media landscape, namely the modern reliance on streaming and digitization of what was once analog, and the advent of simple worldwide connection and mass conversation. Old media, or "legacy media" conglomerates include Disney, Warner Media, ViacomCBS, Bertelsmann Publishers, and NewsCorp., owners of Fox news and entertainment, and span from books to audio to visual media. These conglomerates are often owned and inherited between families, such as the Murdochs of NewsCorp. Due to traditional media's heavy use in economics and political structures, it remains current regardless of New Media's emergence.

Challenges faced by old media conglomerates 
The advent of new communication technology (NCT) has brought forth a set of opportunities and challenges for conventional media. The presence of new media and the Internet in particular, has posed a challenge to conventional media, especially the printed newspaper. The new media have also affected the way newspapers get and circulate their news. Since 1999, almost 90% of daily newspapers in the United States have been actively using online technologies to search for articles and most of them also create their own news websites to reach new markets. 

The challenges faced by old media, especially newspapers, has to do with the combination of the global economic crisis, dwindling readership and advertising dollars, and the inability of newspapers to monetize their online efforts. Newspapers, especially in the West and the US in particular, have lost the lion's share of classified advertisement to the Internet. Additionally, a depressed economy forced more readers to cancel their newspaper subscriptions, and business firms to cut their advertising budget as part of the overall cost-cutting measurements. As a result, closures of newspapers, bankruptcy, job cuts and salary cuts are widespread. 

This has made some representatives of the US newspaper industry seek bailouts from the government by allowing U.S. newspapers to recoup taxes they paid on profits previously to help offset some of their current losses. Accusations are being made toward search engine giants by publishers such as Sir David Bell, who categorically accused Google and Yahoo of "stealing" the contents of newspapers. A similar allegation came from media mogul Rupert Murdoch in early April of 2009, questioning if Google “should…steal all our copyrights.” Likewise, Sam Zell, owner of the Tribune Company that publishes the Chicago Tribune, the Los Angeles Times and the Baltimore Sun claimed it was the newspapers in America who allowed Google to steal their content, and therefore credited themselves for providing Google with their content.

Old media as cultural construct and colloquialism 
Old Media, opposed with its newer counterpart, has been found by theorists and historians like Chris Anderson (author of The Long Tail and the long tail phenomenon of mass communication), Marshall McLuhan, Wolfgang Ernst, and Carolyn Marvin to be inaccurate to the realities of mass communication's progression. McLuhan, specifically, argues that a medium's information is contingent upon the medium itself. In so doing, it never dies and always remains current. Therefore, the binary of old and new media, with new media making old become obsolete, is inaccurate. It would be far more accurate, according to theoretical argument of authors like Ernst, to view new and old media as a spectrum. The challenges faced by old media, therefore, will never completely remove them from the public mass media sphere. 

"Old media" as an idea only ever existed because "New Media" does. In the research of Simone Natale, the use of the term "Old Media" in a survey of books only began to become popular in the late twentieth century once the developments of New Media, such as the internet, became widely available. Natale writes of Old Media as a social construct because of this; because no media is old, one compares old to new in hindsight.

See also 
New media
Residual media
Media intelligence
Decline of newspapers
History of telecommunications
Mainstream media
Social media

References 

Mass media
New media